Butterfly is a 2017 album by Natalie Merchant released as part of "The Natalie Merchant Collection," a 10-compact disc box set that features Merchant's eight solo albums. The album features four new songs and six catalogue songs re-recorded with a string quartet and a full disc of rarities and outtakes.

Track listing

References

External links 

2017 albums
Natalie Merchant albums